Juan de Frías (died 1485) was a Roman Catholic prelate who served as Bishop of Rubicón (1474–1485).

Biography
He was appointed during the papacy of Pope Sixtus IV, and held the position until his death in 1485.

References

External links and additional sources
 (for Chronology of Bishops)
 (for Chronology of Bishops)

15th-century Roman Catholic bishops in the Kingdom of Aragon
Bishops appointed by Pope Sixtus IV
1485 deaths